Havryil Heorhiy Blazhovskyi, O.S.B.M. (born as Juraj Mankovič; , , , c. 1705 – 20 December 1742) was the bishop of the Vicariate Apostolic for the Ruthenians in Mukacheve from 1738 to his death in 1742.

Life
Heorhiy Blazhovskyi was born on about 1705 in the village of Blažov, from which he took his surname (which originally was Mankovič). He studied philosophy in Košice and than in the Jesuit college of Trnava.  At the end of his studies, he was ordained secular priest in 1729 by Bishop Hennadiy Bizantsiy and assigned to the Vicariate Apostolic of Mukacheve.

At the death of his predecessor, he was appointed, on 14 January 1738 as general vicar by the Latin bishop of Eger. He received the titular see of Agnus on 12 September 1738 and was consecrated bishop on 27 December 1738 by the Metropolitan of Kiev and all Rus', Atanasiy Sheptytskyi in Lviv. A few time before consecration, Heorhiy Blazhovskyi entered in the Order of Saint Basil the Great and took the religious name of Havryil.

Bishop Havryil Blazhovskyi died in Mukachevo on 20 December 1742.

Notes

1705 births
1742 deaths
Bishops of the Uniate Church of the Polish–Lithuanian Commonwealth
Order of Saint Basil the Great
18th-century Eastern Catholic bishops
Year of birth uncertain